Feldkirch may refer to:

Places
 Feldkirch, Vorarlberg, a medieval city and capital of an administrative district in Austria
 Feldkirch (district), an administrative division of Vorarlberg, Austria
 Feldkirch (Hartheim), a village in the municipality Hartheim, in Baden-Württemberg, Germany
 Feldkirch, Haut-Rhin, a commune (municipality) in France
 County of Feldkirch, a county in the Holy Roman Empire

Other uses
 Battle of Feldkirch, a 1799 battle between Republican France and Habsburg Austria
 VEU Feldkirch, a professional ice hockey team from Feldkirch, Austria

See also
 
 Feldkirchen (disambiguation)